Events in the year 1959 in Bolivia.

Incumbents 
 President: Hernán Siles Zuazo (MNR)
 Vice President: Vacant

Ongoing events 
 Bolivian National Revolution (1952–1964)

Events 
 19 April – An attempted coup d'état led by the Bolivian Socialist Falange (FSB) fails to depose President Siles Zuazo and ends in the suicide of the FSB's leader.

Births 
 5 June – Betty Tejada, president of the Chamber of Deputies from 2013 to 2014.

Deaths 
 19 April – Óscar Únzaga, 43, leader of the Bolivian Socialist Falange (b. 1916)

References 

 
1900s in Bolivia
Bolivia
Bolivia
Years of the 20th century in Bolivia